The following is a list of events affecting American television during 2004. Events listed include television series debuts, finales, cancellations, and new channel initiations.

Events

January

February

March

April

May

June

July

August

September

October

November

December

Programs

Debuts

Returning this year

Ending this year

Made-for-TV movies

Entering syndication this year

Shows changing networks

Television stations

Station launches

Network affiliation changes

Births

Deaths

See also
 2004 in the United States
 List of American films of 2004

References

External links
List of 2004 American television series at IMDb

 
2000s in American television